Harkort is a surname. Notable people with the surname include:

Eduard Harkort (1797–1836), German-born colonel in the Texas Revolution
Friedrich Harkort (1793–1880), German industrialist 
Gustav Harkort (1795–1865), German entrepreneur and railroad pioneer
Louisa Catharina Harkort (1718–1795), German ironmaster